A coonskin cap is a hat fashioned from the skin and fur of a raccoon. The original coonskin cap consisted of the entire skin of the raccoon including its head and tail. Beginning as traditional Native American headgear, coonskin caps became associated with North American frontiersmen of the 18th and 19th centuries, and were highly popular among boys in the United States, Canada, the United Kingdom and Australia in the 1950s.

Origin
Coonskin caps were originally popular Native American article of clothing. With much of the land along the Eastern Seaboard already settled, immigrants from Germany, Scotland and Ireland (considered too 'rough' for the coastal towns by many) ventured into the forested and mountainous Appalachian region. These groups lived a subsistence lifestyle and often interacted with Native Americans in the area which included adopting some of their customs and dress. 

The coonskin cap quickly became a part of the iconic image associated with American frontiersmen such as Daniel Boone and Davy Crockett. Boone did not actually wear coonskin caps, which he disliked, and instead wore felt hats, but explorer Meriwether Lewis wore a coonskin cap during the Lewis and Clark Expedition. Joseph L. Meek wore the coonskin cap in the mountains.

An account of actor Noah Ludlow introducing the popular song "The Hunters of Kentucky" while wearing a coonskin cap is shown to be spurious in Ludlow's autobiography.  Ludlow recounted that initial performance of 1822: 

As soon as the comedy of the night was over, I dressed myself in a buckskin hunting-shirt and leggins, which I borrowed off a river man, and with moccasins on my feet and an old slouched hat on my head, and a rifle on my shoulder, I presented myself before the audience.

20th century popularity

Estes Kefauver
Politician Estes Kefauver of Tennessee adopted the coonskin cap as a personal trademark during his successful 1948 campaign for election to the United States Senate. Tennessee political boss E. H. Crump had published advertisements accusing Kefauver of being a raccoon-like Communist puppet. In response, Kefauver put on a coonskin cap during a speech in Memphis, proclaiming: "I may be a pet coon, but I'm not Boss Crump's pet coon." He continued to use the coonskin cap as a trademark throughout his political career, which included unsuccessful campaigns for the Democratic presidential nomination in 1952 and 1956, an unsuccessful campaign for the Vice Presidency as Adlai Stevenson's running mate in 1956, and successful Senatorial re-election campaigns in 1954 and 1960.

1950s fad

In the 20th century, the iconic association was in large part due to Disney's television program Disneyland and the first three Davy Crockett episodes starring Fess Parker, which aired from December 1954 to February 1955. In the episodes, which once again made Crockett into one of the most popular men in the country, the frontier hero was portrayed wearing a coonskin cap. The show spawned several Disneyland Davy Crockett sequels as well as other similar shows and movies, with many of them featuring Parker as the lead actor. Parker went on to star in a Daniel Boone television series (1964–1970), again wearing a coonskin cap. 

Crockett's new popularity initiated a fad among boys all over the United States as well as a Davy Crockett craze in the United Kingdom. The look of the cap that was marketed to young boys was typically simplified; it was usually a faux fur lined skull cap with a raccoon tail attached. A variation was marketed to young girls as the Polly Crockett hat. It was similar in style to the boys' cap, including the long tail, but was made of all-white fur (faux or possibly rabbit). At the peak of the fad, coonskin caps sold at a rate of 5,000 caps a day. By the end of the 1950s, Crockett's popularity waned and the fad slowly died out. The fad is recalled by numerous cultural references, such as the wearing of coonskin caps as part of The Junior Woodchucks uniform in Disney's Donald Duck comics. Novelist Thomas Pynchon referenced both the hat and the fashion in his novel V., where he refers to the hat as a "bushy Freudian hermaphrodite symbol".

Other uses
Coonskin caps are powerful cultural symbols that continued to be seen in film, television, and other contexts in the latter decades of the 20th century.

 In the 1964 ABC-TV series The Addams Family, Uncle Fester occasionally wore a coonskin cap dyed black with a white strip running down the middle of both the crown and the tail, suggesting that it was made from the skin of a skunk.
 In Bob Dylan's song "Subterranean Homesick Blues", "The man in the coon-skin cap / By the big pen / Wants eleven dollar bills / You only got ten."
 The 1983 film A Christmas Story, which features various cultural artifacts of American childhood from the 1930s, 1940s, and 1950s, depicts a boy wearing a coonskin cap.
 The Simpsons depicts Jebediah Springfield, the early 19th-century founder of the fictional town of Springfield, in a coonskin cap.
 Florida politician Lawton Chiles put on a coonskin cap while celebrating his 1994 gubernatorial re-election victory over Republican Jeb Bush, recalling a campaign statement in which Chiles had predicted victory by saying "the old he-coon walks just before the light of day".
 The Great Brain series features Parley Benson, a person who wears a coonskin cap.
 In Walt Disney's stories, the Junior Woodchucks Huey, Dewey and Louie Duck also wear coonskin caps.
 In the American History cartoon Histeria!, Kip Ling, the bow-haired girl, Froggo and Aka Pella are seen wearing coonskin caps when they sing a song about Philo Farnsworth. Toast has been seen wearing one on a bus with the Kid Chorus.
 Ferb from the American cartoon Phineas and Ferb is seen wearing a coonskin cap when he saws a log with Phineas (episode: "She's the Mayor")
 Senator Jack S. Phogbound of Li'l Abner comic strip wears a coonskin cap.
 Sam Shakusky. a lead character of Wes Anderson's 2012 film Moonrise Kingdom, is frequently seen wearing a coonskin cap. The film is set in 1965 and incorporates many elements of 1950s and 1960s youth culture.
 In the acclaimed Disney channel cartoon Gravity Falls, various characters can be seen wearing coonskin caps in the series, most notably Pacifica Northwest in the episode "Irrational Treasure".
 The Volunteer, one of the costumed mascots for the sports teams of the University of Tennessee, wears a coonskin cap and fringed buckskins, inspired by the frontier attire of many of Tennessee's volunteers in the War of 1812, the inspiration for the state and university's nickname.
 The first issue of Guardians of the Galaxy sees Rocket Raccoon pestering his teammates about the newly formed team's name. Upon suggesting "Rocket Raccoon and His Human Hangers-On", Drax the Destroyer sarcastically replies "How about 'Drax and his Coonskin Cap', that grab you?"

See also
Ushanka

References

External links

The Coonskin Cap
Height of the Craze. 1957 Wales

1950s fads and trends
History of fashion
1950s fashion
Mountain men
Fur trade
Caps
Hats
Native American clothing
Western wear
Hudson's Bay Company
Davy Crockett
American fashion
Canadian fashion
Raccoons in popular culture